Jülich Solar Tower is a  high experimental concentrated solar power (CSP) tower, Germany's sole plant using this type of solar power technology. In September 2008 the plant was put into operation on a trial basis. Over 2,000 dual-axis sun-tracking mirrors heat air to 700 °C, which is used to generate steam which flows through a turbine to generate electricity. Insulated steel tanks allow storage of heat for 1.5 hours in the event of clouds passing over. The total electric output of the plant is 1.5 MW.  In 2011 it was sold to the German Aerospace Center.

See also

List of solar thermal power stations
Renewable energy in the European Union
Solar thermal energy
The Solar Project

External links
 DLR website on the Jülich solar tower (German)
 DLR website on the Jülich solar tower (English)

References

Buildings and structures in Düren (district)
Solar power stations in Germany
Solar thermal energy
Towers in Germany